Pfeiffera is a genus of flowering plants in the family Cactaceae, found in Bolivia and northwest Argentina. There is some debate about the circumscription of the genus. It is in the Phyllocacteae tribe.
 
The genus name of Pfeiffera is in honour of Ludwig Karl Georg Pfeiffer (1805–1877), a German physician, botanist and conchologist. 
It was first described and published in Cact. Hort. Dyck., edt. 1844 on page 40 in 1845.

Species
The following species are accepted:

References

Echinocereeae
Cactoideae genera
Flora of Bolivia
Flora of Northwest Argentina
Plants described in 1845